Swintonia is a genus of plants in the family Anacardiaceae.

Species
The Catalogue of Life lists the following species; those marked with a * are confirmed by Plants of the World Online:
 Swintonia acuminata Merr.
 Swintonia acuta Engl.
 Swintonia elmeri Merr.
 Swintonia floribunda Griff. *
 Swintonia foxworthyi
 Swintonia glauca
 Swintonia minuta
 Swintonia minutalata
 Swintonia parkinsonii (C.E.C.Fisch.) Kosterm. *
 Swintonia pierrei Hance *
 Swintonia robinsonii Ridley
 Swintonia sarawakana
 Swintonia schwenkii (Teijsm. & Binn.) Hook.f. *
 Swintonia spicifera Hook. f.
 Swintonia whitmorei (Kochummen) Kosterm. *

References

 
Anacardiaceae genera
Taxonomy articles created by Polbot